Jiang Chuan (born August 9, 1994 in Beijing) is a male Chinese volleyball player. He is the captain of   China men's national volleyball team. On club level he plays for JT Thunders Hiroshima in V.League Division 1.

Career
Jiang was selected to China men's national volleyball team since 2016. He represented China to participated in 2016 Asian Men's Volleyball Cup, which was his first international match. He performed well and was awarded Best Opposite Spiker.

In 2017, Jiang played at Group 2 of 2017 FIVB Volleyball World League, he was totally scored 164 points in the tournament, which made him ranked at third place on the Best Scorers List.

In 2018, Jiang has an outstanding performance in 2018 FIVB Volleyball Men's Nations League, he scored 274 points in the tournament, finally ranked the top scorer while the Preliminary round is finished.

In the late of 2019, it was announced that he would be the new captain of Chinese national team.

Personal life
On October 24, 2021, he held his marriage ceremony with his girlfriend whom he had dated for three years.

Awards

Clubs
 2013 National Games of China —  Champion, with Beijing Junior
 2014–2015 Chinese Volleyball League —  Bronze medal, with Beijing
 2015–2016 Chinese Volleyball League —  Runner-Up, with Beijing
 2016–2017 Chinese Volleyball League —  Runner-Up, with Beijing
 2017 National Games of China —  Runner-Up, with Beijing
 2017–2018 Chinese Volleyball League —  Runner-Up, with Beijing
 2018–2019 Chinese Volleyball League —  Runner-Up, with Beijing

Individual
2016 AVC Cup — Best Opposite Spiker

See also
Profile in 2017 World League

References

1994 births
Living people
Opposite hitters
Volleyball players from Beijing
Chinese men's volleyball players